The Bengali Brahmins are Hindu Brahmins who traditionally reside in the Bengal region of the Indian subcontinent, currently comprising the Indian state of West Bengal and the country of Bangladesh. 

The Bengali Brahmins, along with Baidyas and Kayasthas, are regarded among the three traditional higher castes of Bengal. In the colonial era, the Bhadraloks of Bengal were primarily, but not exclusively, drawn from these three castes, who continue to maintain a collective hegemony in West Bengal.

History
Multiple land-grants to Brahmins, from since the Gupta Era have been observed. The Dhanaidaha copper-plate inscription, dated to 433 CE, is the earliest of them and records a grantee Brahmin named Varahasvamin. The 7th-century Nidhanpur copperplate inscription mentions that a marshy land tract adjacent to an existing settlement was given to more than 208 Vaidika Brahmins (Brahmins versed in the Vedas) belonging to 56 gotras and different Vedic schools.

It is traditionally believed that much later, in the 11th century CE, after the decline of the Pala dynasty, a Hindu king,  Adisura brought in five Brahmins from Kanauj, his purpose being to provide education for the Brahmins already in the area whom he thought to be ignorant, and revive traditional orthodox Brahminical Hinduism. As per tradition, these five immigrant Brahmins and their descendants went on to become the Kulin Brahmins. According to Sengupta, multiple accounts of this legend exist, and historians generally consider this to be nothing more than myth or folklore lacking historical authenticity. Identical stories of migration of Orissan Brahmins exist under the legendary king of Yayati Kesari. According to Sayantani Pal, D.C Sircar opines that, the desideration of Bengali Brahmins to gain more prestige by connecting themselves with the Brahmins from the west, 'could have contributed' to the establishment of the system of 'kulinism'.

Post Partition of India
When the British left India in 1947, carving out separate nations, many Brahmins, whose original homes were in the newly created Islamic Republic of Pakistan, migrated en masse to be within the borders of the newly defined Republic of India, and continued to migrate for several decades thereafter to escape Islamist persecution.

Notable people 
 
 
 Raja Ganesha, founder of the Ganesha dynasty of Bengal
 Raja Krishnachandra Roy, Raja of Nadia Raj
 Rudranarayan, Maharaja of Bhurishrestha
 Bhavashankari, Queen of Bhurishrestha
 Rani Bhabani Queen of Natore, kingdom of Rajshahi
 Abhijit Banerjee (born 1961), winner of the 2019 Nobel Memorial Prize in Economic Sciences
 Surendranath Banerjee (1848-1925), founder of the Indian National Association, first Indian to pass the Indian civil service examination
Mahesh Chandra Nyayratna Bhattacharyya (1836-1906), Sanskrit scholar
Bankim Chandra Chatterjee (1838-1894), Indian Bengali novelist, poet and journalist 
Suniti Kumar Chatterji (1890-1977), linguist
 Sourav Ganguly (born 1972), President of BCCI and former captain of Indian National Cricket Team. 
 Bagha Jatin (1879-1915), leader of the Jugantar party of revolutionary freedom fighters in Bengal
 Ashok Kumar (1911-2001), Indian film actor
 Kishore Kumar (1929-1987), Indian playback singer, actor, music director, lyricist, writer, director, producer and screenwriter
 Uttam Kumar (1926-1980), Indian Bengali actor
 Ashutosh Mukherjee (1864-1924), educator and barrister
 Pranab Mukherjee (1935-2020), 13th President of India and a veteran leader of the Indian National Congress
 Syama Prasad Mukherjee (1901-1953), politician, barrister
 Hara Prasad Shastri (1853-1931), founder of the Charyapada.
 Dwarkanath Tagore (1794–1846), one of the first Indian industrialists to form an enterprise with British partners
 Rabindranath Tagore (1861-1941), poet who won the Nobel Prize in Literature
Ishwar Chandra Vidyasagar (1820-1891), educator and social reformer
M. N. Roy (1887-1954), Indian revolutionary, formed Communist party in India and Mexico
Ram Mohan Roy (1772-1833), social reformer

See also
 Kulin Brahmin

Notes

References
An Introduction to the Study of Indian History, by Damodar Dharmanand Kosāmbi, Popular Prakasan,35c Tadeo Road, Popular Press Building, Bombay-400034, First Edition: 1956, Revised Second Edition: 1975.
Atul Sur, Banglar Samajik Itihas (Bengali), Calcutta, 1976
NN Bhattacharyya, Bharatiya Jati Varna Pratha (Bengali), Calcutta, 1987
RC Majumdar, Vangiya Kulashastra (Bengali), 2nd ed, Calcutta, 1989.
Bhattacharya, Jogendra Nath (1896). Hindu Castes and Sects: An Exposition of the Origin of the Hindu Caste System and the Bearing of the Sects toward Each Other and toward Other Religious Systems. Calcutta: Thacker, Spink. p. iii.
 

 
Bengali Hindu castes
Social groups of West Bengal
Brahmin communities by language